Creaghanroe railway station was on the Castleblayney, Keady and Armagh Railway in Ireland.

The Castleblayney, Keady and Armagh Railway opened the station on 1 December 1910.

It closed on 2 April 1923.

Routes

References

Disused railway stations in County Monaghan
Railway stations opened in 1910
Railway stations closed in 1923